Sir Edward Holden (1885–1947) was an Australian vehicle manufacturer.

Edward Holden may also refer to:
Edward Anthony Holden (1805–1877), English landowner
Edward F. Holden (1901–1925), American mineralogist
Edward S. Holden (1846–1914), American astronomer
Edward Thomas Holden (1831–1926), British businessman and Liberal politician
Sir Edward Holden, 1st Baronet (1848–1919), British banker and Liberal politician